Kenneth Alexander Walter (5 November 1939 – 13 September 2003) was a South African cricketer who played in two Tests in 1961.

References

External links
 

1939 births
2003 deaths
South Africa Test cricketers
South African cricketers
Gauteng cricketers